The Kulikalon Lakes, also spelt Kul-i Kalon, are a group of three glacial lakes, or tarns, in the Zeravshan Mountains of south-western Sughd Province in western Tajikistan. The lakes and their surrounds have been identified by BirdLife International as an Important Bird Area (IBA).

Description
The lakes are 55 km south-east of the district centre of Panjakent.  They lie in the Kulikalon cirque among remnants of juniper forest. They are fed by meltwater from the Chimtarga glacier, with water levels peaking in summer, and are drained by the Artuch River. The middle part of the cirque is at an altitude of 2800 m above sea level with the adjacent mountains rising to 3000–3500 m. The area contains the largest remaining blocks of juniper forest in the western half of the Zeravshan Range, on the edge of the Chimtarga massif. The area around the lakes is used as pasture.

Birds
The site was classified as an IBA because it supports significant numbers of the populations of various bird species, either as residents, or as breeding or passage migrants.  These include Himalayan snowcocks, saker falcons, Himalayan vultures, solitary snipe, yellow-billed choughs, Hume's larks, sulphur-bellied warblers, wallcreepers, white-winged redstarts, brown accentors, water pipits, crimson-winged finches and white-winged grosbeaks.

References

Important Bird Areas of Tajikistan
Lakes of Tajikistan
Sughd Region